Billingsley is a village in Autauga County, Alabama, United States. At the 2020 census, the population was 125. It is part of the Montgomery Metropolitan Statistical Area.

Education facilities 
 Billingsley High School

Geography
Billingsley is located at 32°39'37.498" North, 86°42'40.489" West (32.660416, -86.711247).

Demographics

As of the census of 2000, there were 116 people, 46 households, and 33 families residing in the town. The racial makeup of the town was 90.52% White, 6.03% Black or African American, 1.72% Native American and 1.72% Pacific Islander.

There were 46 households, out of which 21.7% had children under the age of 18 living with them, 54.3% were married couples living together, 15.2% had a female householder with no husband present, and 26.1% were non-families. 19.6% of all households were made up of individuals, and 13.0% had someone living alone who was 65 years of age or older. The average household size was 2.52 and the average family size was 2.94.

In the town, the population was spread out, with 20.7% under the age of 18, 5.2% from 18 to 24, 29.3% from 25 to 44, 20.7% from 45 to 64, and 24.1% who were 65 years of age or older. The median age was 40 years. For every 100 females, there were 73.1 males. For every 100 females age 18 and over, there were 84.0 males.

The median income for a household in the town was $44,688, and the median income for a family was $46,000. Males had a median income of $30,625 versus $15,750 for females. The per capita income for the town was $14,713. There were 10.0% of families and 11.7% of the population living below the poverty line, including 14.8% of under eighteens and 4.8% of those over 64.

Climate
The climate in this area is characterized by hot, humid summers and generally mild to cool winters. According to the Köppen Climate Classification system, Billingsley has a humid subtropical climate, abbreviated "Cfa" on climate maps.

References 

Towns in Alabama
Towns in Autauga County, Alabama
Montgomery metropolitan area